An Ordinary Miracle is a Soviet 1964 romantic fantasy film, directed by Erast Garin and based on a play by Yevgeni Shvarts.

King's palace was filmed in Vorontsov Palace.

Cast 
 Aleksey Konsovsky
 Nina Zorskaya	
 Oleg Vidov as The Bear
 Erast Garin as The King
 Nelli Maksimova as The Princess
 Georgi Georgiu as Minister Administrator
 Aleksei Dobronravov
 Valentina Karavayeva
 Viktor Avdyushko
 Klavdiya Lepanova
 Svetlana Konovalova
 Yevgeni Vesnik as The Hunter
 Georgi Millyar

See also
 An Ordinary Miracle (1978 film) - another adaptation of the same play.

External links 

Films based on works by Evgeny Shvarts
1964 films
1960s Russian-language films
Gorky Film Studio films
1960s romantic fantasy films
Russian fantasy films
Films shot in Crimea
1964 romantic comedy films
Soviet fantasy films